Tuyajto Lake is a salt lake located in the Antofagasta Region, northern Chile. Presently, the lake is groundwater-fed and has no surface outlet but water might seep out underground. It is part of the Los Flamencos Natural Reserve.

The lake 

Lake levels also vary with the discharge of springs that feed it. At times Tuyajto Lake is almost empty, and salts such as gypsum and halite can be seen on the edges. Wetlands occur on the eastern shores, and the local flora and fauna depend on the water supply to the lake. The Cordón de Puntas Negras separates Tuyajto Lake from Lejía Lake.

At that time between 13,8009,100 calibrated radiocarbon years ago or 12,80010,300 years ago Tuyajto Lake was much larger, having an area of - and its uppermost shoreline reached  elevation. During the previous highstand and as lake levels dropped, a minor river delta grew on the eastern side of the lake, with additional deltas forming as lake levels decreased.

Hydrology 

Springs, four of which are permanent, are the main source of its water which flows for some distance before reaching the lake surface; diffuse seepage of water within the wetlands and the lake itself makes up the rest of the water supply. Part of the water comes from Tuyajto volcano as well as Pampa Las Tecas and Pampa Colorada east and northeast from Tuyajto Lake and flows underground towards Tuyajto. In general, groundwater in the region is salty to brackish, it originates as rain or snow and probably obtains salts from underground salt bodies. The lake does not overflow at its surface, evaporation and perhaps underground drainage towards Salar Aguas Calientes farther west are mainly responsible for removing water from the lake.

Geology 

The regional geology is characterized by a number of stratovolcanoes with ages ranging from Miocene to Holocene and ignimbrites of Miocene to Holocene age that form a thick layer underneath the volcanoes; the Tuyajto Ignimbrite which crops out on the western and northern shores of the lake has been dated to 500,000 ± 500,000 years ago. Alluvial deposits and lake sediments occur in the whole region; the lake sediments in particular can be found south and east of Tuyajto Lake and form alluvial fans on its eastern side.

Tuyajto Lake lies within a  endorheic basin which spreads out east of the lake; west lies the Salar Aguas Calientes basin. Of these, the last two are of Miocene age while Tuyajto is of Pliocene to Pleistocene age; the Miocene volcanoes are weathered while Tuyajto features a fumarolic patch and an eruption that took place 530,000 ± 170,000 years ago.

Climate 

Moisture originates from the Atlantic Ocean, the equatorial Pacific and the Gran Chaco in Argentina; it falls mostly during winter unlike the rest of the Altiplano where summer precipitation dominates. Potential evaporation reaches .

Precipitation is variable both over annual and millennial timescales, with complex regional variations during El Nino and La Nina years and with past increases during the Central Andean Pluvial Events between 18,00014,100 and 13,60010,600 years ago, during which Lake Tuyajto rose. Conversely, during some future climate change scenarios it might dry up altogether. Evaporation is about 7.5–10 times larger, reaching  at  elevation and decreasing with altitude.

Human use 

An Early Archaic archeological site consisting of fireplaces has been found at Tuyajto Lake; it was constructed on a former shoreline and appears to relate to this shoreline. Such archeological sites close to then-shorelines are common for the "Tambillo stage" of early human population in the Atacama. Archeological sites at the lake have been attributed to the "Tuina occupation" between 10,820 and 8,500 years before present. Younger archeological artifacts there have been dated at 8,2108,130 years before present.

The Andes of northern Chile have an arid climate in which a number of closed basins at elevations of over  contain salt lakes and salt pans. Mining and tourism are increasingly important activities in the region and together with growing agriculture and cities have resulted in increased demand for water, resulting in more research in existing water sources. Reportedly, BHP obtains water from the Tuyajto Lake basin. Tuyajto is part of the Los Flamencos Natural Reserve.

References

Sources 

 
 
 
 
 

Tuyajto
Lakes of Antofagasta Region
Saline lakes of South America